Pasquale Ruggiero (San Marzano sul Sarno, Salerno, 1851 – Naples, 1915) was an Italian painter, mainly of portraits and genre subjects in a Realist style.

Biography
He resided in Naples.  In 1877 at Naples, he exhibited: L' ascensione del Pallone and Il primo saluto. In 1881 at Milan, he displayed; Trastulli if infanzia and  Costumi Napoletani.

References

1851 births
1915 deaths
Painters from Naples
19th-century Italian painters
Italian male painters
20th-century Italian painters
19th-century Italian male artists
20th-century Italian male artists